Aurél Stromfeld (September 19, 1878, Budapest – October 10, 1927, Budapest) was a Hungarian general, commander-in-chief of the Hungarian Red Army during the Hungarian Soviet Republic. He had a major role in temporarily pressing back the Czech and Romanian forces invading the Northern and Eastern territories of Hungary during the 1919 Hungarian–Romanian War. He resigned after the acceptance of Georges Clemenceau's proposal for Hungary's new borders.

Honors
 Postage stamp issued by Hungary in his honor on 28 September 1952.

References

1878 births
1927 deaths
Military personnel from Budapest
People from the Kingdom of Hungary
Hungarian people of German descent
Hungarian Communist Party politicians
Hungarian generals
Hungarian people of the Hungarian–Romanian War
Prisoners and detainees of Hungary